Jeff Clark may refer to:

 Jeff Clark (surfer) American surfer
 Jeff Clark (designer) American poet and book designer
 Jeff Clark (musician), bassist in Death by Stereo
 Jeff Ray Clark, American economist
 Jeffrey Clark Ex-Assistant Attorney General - Trump administrationĝ
 Jeffrey Clark letter

See also 
 Jeff Clarke (disambiguation)
 Geoff Clark (disambiguation)